The 1952 Pacific Tigers football team represented the College of the Pacific during the 1952 college football season. Pacific played home games in Pacific Memorial Stadium in Stockton, California.

Pacific competed as an independent in 1952.  In their second season under head coach Ernie Jorge, the Tigers finished the regular season with a record of six wins, three losses and one tie (6–3–1). At the end of the season, Pacific was invited to a New Years Day bowl game for the second consecutive year. On January 1, 1953 they played Mississippi Southern in the Sun Bowl, winning 26–7. That brought their record to seven wins, three losses and one tie (7–3–1). For the season they outscored their opponents 310–166.

Schedule

Notes

References

Pacific
Pacific Tigers football seasons
Sun Bowl champion seasons
Pacific Tigers football